Expandable microspheres are microscopic spheres comprising a thermoplastic shell encapsulating a low boiling point liquid hydrocarbon. When heated to a temperature high enough to soften the thermoplastic shell, the increasing pressure of the hydrocarbon will cause the microsphere to expand. The volume can increase by 60 to 80 times.

Expandable microsphere
The expandable microsphere is a material that can act as a blowing agent when mixed in a product and subsequently heated to cause expansion within the matrix.
The expandable microspheres are off-white, can be 6 to 40 micrometers in average diameter and have a density of 900 to 1400 kg/m3.
The expandable microspheres are used as a blowing agent in products like e.g. puff ink, automotive underbody coatings or injection molding of thermoplastics. Here the product must be heated at some point in the process for the expandable microspheres to expand.

Expanded microsphere 
The expanded microsphere is a material that has been heated to cause expansion. The product acts as a light weight filler in many products.
The expanded microspheres are white, can be 15 to 90 micrometers in average diameter and can have a density of 15 to 70 kg/m3.
The expanded microspheres are used as a lightweight filler in composite materials such as cultured marble, in waterborne paints and crack fillers/joint compound.

Characteristics 
Characteristics that make expandable microspheres unique,
 Ability to expand
 Resilient
 Ultra-low density when expanded
 Closed cells that can be distributed evenly
 Can introduce a pressure in the production process

References

See also 
 Cenosphere
 Glass microsphere
 Microbead
 Microplastics
 Plastic particle water pollution

Thermoplastics
Hydrocarbons